Saugatuck Cures is a 2014 American comedy film. It was directed and produced by Matthew Ladensack, written by Jay Paul Deratany, and stars Max Adler, Danny Mooney, and Judith Chapman. The film premiered at the 2014 Palm Springs International LGBT Film Festival.

Plot
Saugatuck Cures follows a widowed bed and breakfast owner, Maggie Callaghan (Chapman), living in Saugatuck, Michigan, dealing with a second round of cancer. When she cannot afford treatment, Maggie's gay son Drew (Adler) becomes determined to raise money for her treatment, though he does not have the slightest idea of how to do it.

After a falling-out with his affluent sister, Penelope, a religious conservative, Drew is convinced by his eccentric best friend Brett (Danny Mooney), who is straight, to pose as ex-gay ministers in order to raise the money by "converting" homosexuals into heterosexuals. The two friends set forth on a crazy adventure, getting into a lot of trouble with the law, family conflicts and not knowing if they will have enough time to save mom.

Cast
Max Adler as Drew Callaghan
Danny Mooney as Brett Michaels
Judith Chapman as Maggie Callaghan
Amanda Lipinski as Penelope Callaghan
Matthew Klingler as Paul
Julianne Howe-Bouwens as LaQuisha
Jay Paul Deratany as Reverend Stan

Release
Saugatuck Cures premiered Opening Night at the Cinema Diverse: Palm Springs International LGBT Film Festival, Reeling LGBT International Film Festival and QFlix Philadelphia in the same weekend.

Reception
Saugatuck Cures received a negative review from the Los Angeles Times, which stated that "... the film actually vilifies those struggling to reconcile their religious upbringing with their sexual orientation. Given the higher suicide rate among gay youths, you'd expect a little compassion instead of mockery for the closet cases."  Its release at the Cinema Diverse film festival in Palm Springs also resulted in an Audience Choice Award from the same festival.

Home media
Breaking Glass Pictures releases Saugatuck Cures on DVD and digitally on iTunes, Amazon Video, VOD for all cable providers on June 30, 2015.

References

External links
 
 

2014 films
2010s buddy comedy films
2014 independent films
2014 LGBT-related films
2010s comedy road movies
American buddy comedy films
American independent films
American LGBT-related films
American comedy road movies
2010s English-language films
Films set in Michigan
Films shot in Michigan
Gay-related films
LGBT-related buddy comedy films
Religious comedy films
2014 comedy films
2010s American films